Provision Shop (Chinese: 杂货店) is a Singaporean telemovie commissioned by the Ministry of Communications and Information in collaboration with Tribal Worldwide Singapore. It is directed by Royston Tan and stars Sora Ma, Marcus Chin, Li Yinzhu, Siti Khadijah, Brandon Wong, Cui Yang, Aden Tan and Sarah Daniel. The telemovie will debut on television on July 17, 2016 on Mediacorp Channel 8.

Plot
The telemovie tells four stories revolving around a diverse community of locals and foreigners grappling with social tensions, and shows how through mutual understanding and respect, there will eventually be the openness to embrace change and diversity.

Cast
Sora Ma as Gao Ling Ling, the provision shop owner's daughter who is obsessed with Korean dramas
Marcus Chin as the provision shop owner
Li Yinzhu as Madam Goh, also nicknamed "Empress Wu", who is tough on the outside but soft in the inside
Siti Khadijah as Theresita, Madam Goh's helper
Brandon Wong as an ice-delivery man
Cui Yang as the ice-delivery man's supervisor from China
Aden Tan as Peter, a tertiary student who is a frequent patron of the provision shop
Sarah Daniel as a tertiary student in a budding romance with Peter

References

Singaporean television films
2016 television films
2016 films
Films directed by Royston Tan
Films shot in Singapore
Films set in Singapore